The men's lightweight competition in sumo at the 2009 World Games took place on 17 July 2009 at the Kaohsiung Senior High School Gymnasium in Kaohsiung, Taiwan.

Sándor Bárdosi from Hungary had originally won gold medal, but he was stripped of it, because he was tested positive for doping. The IWGA has made reallocations of medals in this event.

Competition format
A total of 15 athletes entered the competition. They fought in the cup system with repechages.

Results

Main draw

Repechages

Semifinals

Finals

References